Dumas Creek is a stream in Clark County, Missouri. It is a tributary on the west side of the Des Moines River and Lee County, Iowa lies across the river.

The stream flows southeast passing northeast of Peaksville and crossing under Missouri Route DD. The Atchison, Topeka and Santa Fe Railroad line follows the stream valley from northeast of Revere to the confluence.

Dumas Creek derives its name from one Mr. Dumass, an early settler.

See also
List of rivers of Missouri

References

Rivers of Clark County, Missouri
Rivers of Missouri